Drora Bruck (born December 31, 1966 in Haifa, Israel) is an Israeli recorder player.

Biography
Drora Bruck graduated from the Jerusalem Academy of Music and Dance, where she studied with Michael Meltzer, for her BMus which was obtained in 1990. Bruck went on to study in the Civica Scuola di Musica in Milan with Pedro Memelsdorff after winning a scholarship from the Italian Ministry of Foreign Affairs.

She teaches at the Faculty of the Performing Arts in the Jerusalem Academy of Music and Dance, and is the director of the Early Music department of the Shtriker Israeli Conservatory of Music in Tel Aviv established in  September 2005.
Since 2014 Drora is a lecturer in the Department of Music, in The Givat Washington College, israel

Bruck has performed and recorded works written for her, from solo pieces to chamber music with voice, guitar, piano, string quartet and electronic sounds.

See also
 Tamar Lalo
Music in Israel

References

External links
Drora Bruck website

Israeli performers of early music
Women performers of early music
Israeli recorder players
1966 births
Living people
People from Haifa
Women flautists